Buriram province (Northern Khmer:) is one of Thailand's seventy-six  Provinces (changwat) and lies in lower northeastern Thailand, also called Isan. Neighboring provinces are (from south clockwise) Sa Kaeo, Nakhon Ratchasima, Khon Kaen, Maha Sarakham, and Surin. To the southeast it borders Oddar Meanchey province of Cambodia. The name "Buriram" means 'city of happiness'.

Geography

Buriram is at the south end of the Khorat Plateau, with several extinct volcanoes around the province. The southern limit of the province is a mountainous area at the limit between the Sankamphaeng Range and the Dângrêk Mountains.

National park
There is one national park, along with three other national parks, make up region 1 (Prachinburi) of Thailand's protected areas. 
 Ta Phraya National Park,

Wildlife sanctuary
There is one wildlife sanctuary, along with two other wildlife sanctuaries, make up region 7 (Nakhon Ratchasima) of Thailand's protected areas. 
 Dong Yai Wildlife Sanctuary,

History

The study of archaeologists has found evidence of human habitation since prehistoric times in Dvaravati period in Buriram including cultural evidence from the ancient Khmer Empire, which has both a brick castle and more than 60 stone castles, and have found important archaeological sites, including kilns, pottery and pottery, earthenware called Khmer wares, which determines the age around the 15th-18th. After the period of ancient Khmer or Khmer culture, the historical evidence of Buriram began to appear again at the end of the Ayutthaya period, which appears to be an old city and later appeared in the Thonburi period to the Rattanakosin period that Buriram was a city.

About a thousand years ago, the area that makes up today's Buriram Province was under the Khmer Empire and many ruins remain from that time. The largest, standing on an extinct volcano, is in the Phanom Rung Historical Park. According to an inscription found there, its local ruler recognised the authority of the Khmer king. However, the area was remote and sparsely populated, and little is recorded about it until the Rattanakosin Kingdom. In the early-19th century, Muang Pae, the largest town, acknowledged Thai sovereignty and was renamed Buriram. Following administrative reforms in the late-19th century, Buriram was formally incorporated into Thailand as a province with its own governor.

Culture

Festivals
Aside from important religious days, Songkran Day and New Year's Day, Buriram also has other local festivals such as the festival of the 5th lunar month when the locals make merit, bathe Buddha images and the aged, play traditional sports such as Saba and tug of war. In some areas like Phutthaisong District, there is the Bang Fai traditional rocket dance, Khao Phansa, at the beginning of Buddhist Lent and Loi Krathong.

Demographics
Buriram is one of the northeastern provinces with a sizable Northern Khmer population. The Isan language is spoken by most, but according to the most recent census 27.6% of the population also speak Northern Khmer in everyday life.

Symbols 

The provincial seal depicts Phanom Rung temple, a Khmer-style Hindu shrine dedicated to Shiva. It was in use from the 9th through the 12th centuries, when the Khmer Empire's control of the region was ended by the Thais of Ayutthaya Kingdom. The ruins are now preserved in a historical park.

The provincial flower is the yellow cotton tree (Cochlospermum regium). The provincial tree is the pink shower (Cassia grandis).

The province's motto is "the city of sandstone sanctuaries, land of volcanoes, beautiful silk, rich culture and the best city of sport".

Administrative divisions

Provincial government

The province is divided into 23 districts (amphoes). The districts are further divided into 189 subdistricts (tambons) and 2,212 villages (mubans).

Local government
As of 26 November 2019 there are: one Buriram Provincial Administration Organisation and 62 municipal (thesaban) areas in the province. Buriram, Chum Het and Nang Rong have town (thesaban mueang) status. Further 59 subdistrict municipalities (thesaban tambon). The non-municipal areas are administered by 146 Subdistrict Administrative Organisations - SAO (ongkan borihan suan tambon).

Transport

Airports
Buriram Airport is the only airport in Buriram province. Two airlines, Nok Air and Thai AirAsia, serve Buriram from Don Mueang International Airport (DMK).

Highways
Highway 218: Buriram - Nang Rong
Highway 219: Ban Kruat - Prakhon Chai - Buriram - Ban Dan - Satuek - Phayakkhaphum Phisai - Yang Sisurat - Na Chueak - Borabue
Highway 226: Nakhon Ratchasima - Chaloem Phra Kiat - Chakkarat - Huai Thalaeng - Lam Plai Mat - Buriram - Krasang - Surin - Sikhoraphum - Samrong Thap - Huai Thap Than - Uthumphon Phisai - Sisaket - Kanthararom - Warin Chamrap - Ubon Ratchathani
Highway 2074: Buriram - Khu Mueang - Phutthaisong

Intercity transit
State Railway of Thailand (SRT), the national passenger rail system, provides service to Buriram at the Buriram Railway Station. SRT provides many services such as limited express trains to Bangkok and Ubon Ratchathani, commuter trains to Nakhon Ratchasima and beyond.

The Transport Co., Ltd. operates a bus depot at Buriram Bus Station, and Nakhonchai Air has its bus station adjacent.

Public transit
The Buriram Songthaew System (BSS) provides public transportation for the city. BSS was established many years ago. There are two lines: Line 1 (Buriram Municipality Market-Khao Kradong Forest Park Line), and Line 2 (Ban Bua Line). Both lines are colored pink.

Health 
Buriram's main hospital is Buriram Hospital operated by the Ministry of Public Health.

Sports 
Buriram promotes itself as a city of sport. Buriram United is the most successful football team in Thailand after sweeping all before them by winning the league, the FA Cup, the League Cup, and AFC Champions League quarter-finalist. Buriram United play home games at Chang Arena, the largest club-owned football stadium in Thailand.

A FIA Grade 1 and FIM Grade A racing circuit, Chang International Circuit, is near Chang Arena.

Human achievement index 2017

Since 2003, United Nations Development Programme (UNDP) in Thailand has tracked progress on human development at sub-national level using the Human achievement index (HAI), a composite index covering all the eight key areas of human development. National Economic and Social Development Board (NESDB) has taken over this task since 2017.

Notable people

Born in Buriram 
 Newin Chidchob (born 1958), politician, chairman of Buriram United
 Sam-A Gaiyanghadao (born 1983), former Muay Thai fighter
 Lalisa Manobal; born Pranpriya Manobal (born 1997), a member of the South Korean girl group BLACKPINK
 Chatchu-on Moksri (born 1999), volleyball player

References

External links

Tourism Authority of Thailand: About Buriram
Buriram Times

Provincial website (Thai)
Buriram provincial map, coat of arms and postal stamp

 
Isan
Provinces of Thailand